The 1954–55 season was Aberdeen's 42nd season in the top flight of Scottish football and their 44th season overall. Aberdeen competed in the Scottish League Division One, Scottish League Cup, and the Scottish Cup.

Results

Division A

Final standings

Scottish League Cup

Group 2

Group 2 final table

Scottish Cup

References

AFC Heritage Trust

Aberdeen F.C. seasons
Aber
Scottish football championship-winning seasons